Felipe Delgado may refer to:
 Felipe Delgado (record producer) (born 1969), American DJ, songwriter and record producer
 Felipe Delgado (swimmer) (born 1973), Ecuadorian swimmer
 Cuban Link (Felix Delgado, born 1974), Cuban rapper